Joshua Thomas "Josh" Vanlandingham (born January 22, 1984) is an American-born Filipino-German former professional basketball player. He last played for the Alaska Aces of the Philippine Basketball Association (PBA). Born in Snohomish, Washington, he was drafted fifth overall in the 2010 PBA Draft.

Professional career

Rain or Shine Elasto Painters
Vanlandingham was drafted fifth overall by Rain or Shine Elasto Painters in the 2010 PBA draft.

Powerade Tigers / GlobalPort Batang Pier
In 2011, he and Doug Kramer were traded to the Powerade Tigers in exchange for Norman Gonzales and J.R. Quiñahan.

Alaska Aces
On August 27, 2014, he was signed by the Alaska Aces.

PBA career statistics

Correct as of October 1, 2015

Season-by-season averages

|-
| align=left | 
| align=left | Rain or Shine
| 32 || 12.1 || .383 || .333 || .649 || 1.6 || .3 || .1 || .1 || 5.0
|-
| align=left | 
| align=left |Powerade
| 48 || 11.9 || .361 || .330 || .643 || 2.1 || .7 || .2 || .2 || 3.9
|-
| align=left | 
| align=left | GlobalPort
| 21 || 14.1 || .375 || .311 || .500 || 1.9 || .4 || .3 || .1 || 3.9
|-
| align=left | 
| align=left | Alaska
| 4 || 5.3 || .500 || .500 || .000 || .3 || .3 || .0 || .0 || 1.5
|-
| align=left | Career
| align=left |
| 105 || 12.1 || .373 || .331 || .638 || 1.8 || .5 || .2 || .1 || 4.1

References

1984 births
Living people
Alaska Aces (PBA) players
American men's basketball players
American people of German descent
American sportspeople of Filipino descent
Filipino men's basketball players
NorthPort Batang Pier players
Pacific Lutheran Lutes men's basketball players
People from Snohomish, Washington
Powerade Tigers players
Rain or Shine Elasto Painters players
Shooting guards
Small forwards
Rain or Shine Elasto Painters draft picks
Citizens of the Philippines through descent